The 1979 Princeton Tigers football team was an American football team that represented Princeton University during the 1979 NCAA Division I-A football season. Princeton tied for second in the Ivy League.

In their second year under head coach Frank Navarro, the Tigers compiled a 5–4 record and outscored opponents 166 to 152. Matthew F. McGrath and Stephen R. Reynolds were the team captains.

Princeton's 5–2 conference record tied for second place in the Ivy League standings. The Tigers outscored Ivy opponents 146 to 97. 

Princeton played its home games at Palmer Stadium on the university campus in Princeton, New Jersey.

Schedule

References

Princeton
Princeton Tigers football seasons
Princeton Tigers football